Skålebrehalsen Terrace is a high ice-covered terrace at the south side of Skålebreen, in the Mühlig-Hofmann Mountains of Queen Maud Land. It was mapped by Norwegian cartographers from surveys and air photos by the Norwegian Antarctic Expedition (1956–60) and named Skålebrehalsen.

References

Plateaus of Antarctica
Landforms of Queen Maud Land
Princess Astrid Coast